The 2015 Hawke's Bay Cup was the second edition of the invitational Hawke's Bay Cup field hockey competition. It took place between 11–19 April 2015 in Hastings,  New Zealand. A total of eight teams competed for the title.

Australia won the tournament for the first time after defeating New Zealand 3–2 in the final. China won the third place match by defeating South Korea 3–1.

Teams
Including New Zealand, 8 teams were invited by the New Zealand Hockey Federation to participate in the tournament.

Results

First round

Pool A

Pool B

Second round

Quarter-finals

Fifth to eighth place classification

Crossover

Seventh and eighth place

Fifth and sixth place

First to fourth place classification

Semi-finals

Third and fourth place

Final

Statistics

Final standings

Goalscorers

References

External links

2015
2015 in women's field hockey
2015 in New Zealand women's sport
2015 in Argentine women's sport
2015 in Australian women's field hockey
2015 in Chinese women's sport
2015 in South Korean women's sport
2015 in Japanese women's sport
2015 in American women's sports
2015 in Indian women's sport